Stellan Nilsson (22 May 1922 – 27 May 2003) was a Swedish football player. He played for the Sweden national football team at the 1950 FIFA World Cup. He was also part of Sweden's squad for the football tournament at the 1948 Summer Olympics, but he did not play in any matches.

References

External links
 Profile
 

1922 births
2003 deaths
Swedish footballers
Sweden international footballers
Swedish expatriate footballers
Allsvenskan players
Serie A players
Serie B players
Genoa C.F.C. players
Ligue 1 players
Ligue 2 players
Malmö FF players
Angers SCO players
Olympique de Marseille players
Olympic footballers of Sweden
Olympic gold medalists for Sweden
Footballers at the 1948 Summer Olympics
1950 FIFA World Cup players
Expatriate footballers in Italy
Expatriate footballers in France
Medalists at the 1948 Summer Olympics
Association football midfielders
Sportspeople from Lund